In Greek mythology, Phoebe (associated with  phoîbos, "shining") was a Messenian princess.

Family 
Phoebe was the daughter of Leucippus and Philodice, daughter of Inachus. She and her sister Hilaera are commonly referred to as Leucippides (that is, "daughters of Leucippus"). In another account, they were the daughters of Apollo. Phoebe married Pollux and bore him a son, named either Mnesileos or Mnasinous.

Mythology 
Phoebe and Hilaera were priestesses of Athena and Artemis, and betrothed to Idas and Lynceus, the sons of Aphareus. Castor and Pollux were charmed by their beauty and carried them off. When Idas and Lynceus tried to rescue their brides-to-be they were both slain, but Castor himself fell. Pollux persuaded Zeus to allow him to share his immortality with his brother.

Notes

Princesses in Greek mythology
Children of Apollo

References 

 Apollodorus, The Library with an English Translation by Sir James George Frazer, F.B.A., F.R.S. in 2 Volumes, Cambridge, MA, Harvard University Press; London, William Heinemann Ltd. 1921. ISBN 0-674-99135-4. Online version at the Perseus Digital Library. Greek text available from the same website.
 Gaius Julius Hyginus, Fabulae from The Myths of Hyginus translated and edited by Mary Grant. University of Kansas Publications in Humanistic Studies. Online version at the Topos Text Project.
 Pausanias, Description of Greece with an English Translation by W.H.S. Jones, Litt.D., and H.A. Ormerod, M.A., in 4 Volumes. Cambridge, MA, Harvard University Press; London, William Heinemann Ltd. 1918. . Online version at the Perseus Digital Library
 Pausanias, Graeciae Descriptio. 3 vols. Leipzig, Teubner. 1903.  Greek text available at the Perseus Digital Library.
 Publius Ovidius Naso, Fasti translated by James G. Frazer. Online version at the Topos Text Project.
 Publius Ovidius Naso, Fasti. Sir James George Frazer. London; Cambridge, MA. William Heinemann Ltd.; Harvard University Press. 1933. Latin text available at the Perseus Digital Library.
 Sextus Propertius, Elegies from Charm. Vincent Katz. trans. Los Angeles. Sun & Moon Press. 1995. Online version at the Perseus Digital Library. Latin text available at the same website.
 Theocritus, Idylls from The Greek Bucolic Poets translated by Edmonds, J M. Loeb Classical Library Volume 28. Cambridge, MA. Harvard Univserity Press. 1912. Online version at theoi.com
 Theocritus, Idylls edited by R. J. Cholmeley, M.A. London. George Bell & Sons. 1901. Greek text available at the Perseus Digital Library.
Demigods in classical mythology
Mythological rape victims

Messenian characters in Greek mythology